Albuquerque is a common Portuguese surname, which may refer to:

 Afonso de Albuquerque (1453–1515), a Portuguese fidalgo and naval general officer
 Cássio Albuquerque dos Anjos (born 1980), a Brazilian goalkeeper
 Felipe Albuquerque (born 1999), Brazilian footballer
 Filipe Albuquerque (born 1985), a Portuguese race car driver
 João Pessoa Cavalcânti de Albuquerque (1878–1930), the governor of Paraíba, Brazil between 1928 and 1930
 Joaquim Arcoverde de Albuquerque Cavalcanti (1850–1930), the first cardinal to be born in the Americas
 Joaquim Augusto Mouzinho de Albuquerque (1855–1902), a Portuguese soldier
 João Albuquerque (born 1986), Portuguese politician
 José Albuquerque (born 1975), a Brazilian boxer
 Lita Albuquerque, US environmental artist, painter and sculptor
 Luís da Silva Mouzinho de Albuquerque (1792–1865), a Portuguese military officer, engineer, poet, scientist and politician
 Marcos Venâncio de Albuquerque (born 1980), Brazilian footballer
 Mike de Albuquerque (born 1947), an English musician
 Oscar Albuquerque (born 1954), a former Canadian soccer midfielder
 Renato de Albuquerque, a Brazilian civil engineer and entrepreneur in the construction and real state businesses
 Roberto Albuquerque (born 1993), American soccer player
 Glasner da Silva Albuquerque (born 1980), known as Esquerdinha  Brazilian footballer

Portuguese-language surnames